Samuel Lewis Casey (February 12, 1821 – August 25, 1902) was a U.S. Representative from Kentucky. Born near Caseyville, Kentucky, Casey attended the country schools.  He engaged in mercantile pursuits.

In 1853, President of the United States Franklin Pierce nominated Casey to be Treasurer of the United States.  Casey held this office from April 4, 1853 to December 22, 1859. He served as member of the Kentucky House of Representatives from 1860 to 1862.

Casey was elected as a Unionist to the 37th United States Congress to fill the vacancy caused by the expulsion of Henry C. Burnett and served as representative of Kentucky's 1st congressional district from March 10, 1862, to March 4, 1863.

Casey then retired from active business pursuits.  He died in Saint Joseph, Missouri on August 25, 1902. He was cremated and his ashes interred in Caseyville Cemetery, Caseyville, Kentucky.

References

External links

1821 births
1902 deaths
People from Union County, Kentucky
Kentucky Unionists
Unionist Party members of the United States House of Representatives from Kentucky
Members of the Kentucky House of Representatives
19th-century American politicians
Members of the United States House of Representatives from Kentucky